Roy Everett Frankhouser, Jr. (also spelled "Frankhauser"; November 4, 1939 – May 15, 2009) was a Grand Dragon of the Ku Klux Klan, a member of the American Nazi Party, a government informant, and a security consultant to Lyndon LaRouche. Frankhouser was reported by federal officials to have been arrested at least 142 times. In 2003 he told a reporter, "I'm accused of everything from the sinking of the Titanic to landing on the moon." He was convicted of federal crimes in at least three cases, including dealing in stolen explosives and obstruction of justice.  Irwin Suall, of the Anti-Defamation League, called Frankhouser "a thread that runs through the history of American hate groups".

Biography

Early years
Frankhouser was born in Reading, Pennsylvania. He attended Northwest Junior High School through the tenth grade, and became active in racist causes. As a teenager, he collected Nazi paraphernalia and uniforms. He joined the United States Army and served one year as a paratrooper before receiving an honorable discharge. He joined the American Nazi Party in 1960.

When he was 19 he met George Lincoln Rockwell, founder of the American Nazi Party. He was later described as a protege of Rockwell's. His first recorded arrest occurred at age 22, when he kicked a policeman in the shins during a 1961 protest in Atlanta.  He participated in Nazi party rallies and Klan demonstrations, being arrested often for disorderly conduct. Fellow Klansmen nicknamed him "Riot Roy". According to Frankhouser, he lost his eye in an attack by pipe-wielding Jews. In another version, he lost it during a fight with blacks in a Reading bar. A third story is that he lost it during the Bay of Pigs invasion. At a fundraising auction for the Klan, one of his glass eyes sold for $5.  He also had a scar on his head which he said was from a brick thrown by a counter-demonstrator.

Dan Burros, a prominent member of the American Nazi Party, committed suicide in Frankhouser's apartment in 1965 upon seeing the headline of a New York Times article revealing Burros's Jewish background.

Frankhouser became the Grand Dragon of Pennsylvania in 1965. The following year he appeared before the House Un-American Activities Committee as part of its investigation of the Ku Klux Klan. He reportedly pleaded the Fifth more than 30 times rather than answer their questions.

In 1972, he marched down Fifth Avenue in Manhattan wearing a black storm trooper's uniform to defy a city ban on wearing Nazi outfits in public. That same year, Frankhouser approached the FBI about working as an informant, offering information on groups such as black militants, the Jewish Defense League, the Irish Republican Army and Black September. The National Security Council approved a mission in which he was sent to Canada to infiltrate Black September, but he was unsuccessful. Frankhouser was also an organizer of the Minutemen and a member of the National States' Rights Party, the National Renaissance Party, the Liberty Lobby, and the White Citizens Council.

Frankhouser was convicted of conspiring to sell  of stolen dynamite in 1975. The charges included selling explosives which were used in the bombing of a school bus in Pontiac, Michigan that killed one man.  During the trial he revealed he was a government informant, saying that he was acting on behalf of the U.S. Bureau of Alcohol, Tobacco and Firearms (ATF). The government denied his assertion. Though he faced up to fifty-one years in prison, he was sentenced to two concurrent five-year probation terms as part of a plea agreement. Lyndon LaRouche initiated a legal defense on behalf of Frankhouser. When the LaRouche movement learned that Frankhouser was an informant, it saw that as evidence of the "FBI-CIA-Rockefeller-Buckley" control of the extreme Right, and an example of how government connections could immunize criminal behavior.

LaRouche trial
Frankhouser became a security consultant for political activist Lyndon LaRouche in 1979 after Frankhouser convinced LaRouche that Frankhouser was actively connected to U.S. intelligence agencies. In a 1984 deposition, LaRouche described Frankhouser as "an expert in security matters" who can "detect nasties by their wiggle". In U.S. v. Frankhauser, Frankhouser testified that he and LaRouche security employee Forrest Lee Fick had invented a connection to the CIA in order to justify his $700 a week salary as a security consultant. He said that he had persuaded a friend to play a former top CIA official (named "Ed" by Frankhouser, after "Mister Ed") in meetings with LaRouche. When LaRouche found out about a grand jury investigation, he reportedly told Frankhouser to get the CIA to quash it. Frankhouser told LaRouche that the CIA wanted him to destroy evidence and hide witnesses. Frankhouser claimed that on another occasion LaRouche sent him to Boston to check on the grand jury investigation. Instead of going to Boston he went to a Star Trek convention in Scranton, Pennsylvania and called to warn LaRouche that the FBI had wiretapped his phones.  During the grand jury investigation, documents were presented which showed Frankhouser had advised members of the organization that unless they handled matters correctly they could "start writing a concerto for canaries in B major." He suggested destroying records, writing in a letter to LaRouche that "paper burns at 451 degrees Fahrenheit, a scientific fact." As soon as he was arrested, he began cooperating with federal prosecutors. He testified that members of LaRouche's organization had asked him to assassinate former U.S. Secretary of State Henry Kissinger, an enemy of the LaRouche movement. He also said that he had been ordered by Jeffrey Steinberg, LaRouche's head of counterintelligence, to organize pickets to disrupt the grand jury proceedings.

LaRouche was called as a defense witness in Frankhouser's trial but he refused to testify, exercising his Fifth Amendment right to avoid self-incrimination. Frankhouser was found guilty on December 10, 1987, of obstruction of the federal investigation into credit card fraud.  He was sentenced by US District Judge Robert E. Keeton to three years and a $50,000 fine. After his conviction, he was granted immunity against further prosecution and compelled to testify against LaRouche. Frankhouser appealed his conviction on April 3, 1989, arguing that his case should not have been severed from the main case, that his counsel had inadequate time to prepare, and that he was not provided with allegedly exculpatory evidence. The appeal was rejected in July.

Clayton trial
Starting in the 1980s he appeared regularly on Berks County public-access television with his white supremacist shows "Race and Reason" and "White Forum".

He was arrested April 28, 1993, for stabbing a KKK guard at a Klan convention. He testified that he was ambushed by the guard and several skinheads, and that he defended himself with his Swiss Army knife. He was acquitted of the crime due to self-defense.

In 1995 he was convicted in a federal court in Boston of advising the mother of Brian Clayton, the white supremacist head of the "New Dawn Hammerskins" gang, to destroy evidence linking her son to the desecration of synagogues and to attacks on black residents. Frankhouser had been harboring Clayton, who was sought by the FBI, for nine months. At the time, Frankhouser was described by the U.S. Attorney as the leader of the Pale Riders faction of the KKK. US District Court Judge Patti B. Saris sentenced him to 25-month in prison. On appeal one count of obstruction of justice was overturned while another was affirmed.

Jouhari trial
According to a 1997 complaint, Frankhouser, then Grand Dragon of the United Klans of America in Pennsylvania, had been harassing Bonnie Jouhari and her daughter. Jouhari was a white woman who worked at the Reading-Berks Human Relations Council, helping out people who had been discriminated against. After many unsuccessful attempts by Jouhari to get government agencies to act, she convinced the SPLC to take her case. Frankhouser eventually settled the case with terms set by the judge. Frankhouser had to complete 1000 hours of community service, make public apologies to Jouhari and her daughter on his "White Forum" TV show and local newspapers, pay them 10% of his income for a decade, and undergo "sensitivity training". The settlement was supported by HUD Secretary Andrew Cuomo and Reverend Jesse Jackson at a press conference also attended by NAACP president Kweisi Mfume.

Later years
Frankhouser became the pastor of the Mountain Church of Jesus Christ, an arm of Robert E. Miles' movement. Frankhouser held services in his home, and sought a property tax exemption for the row house. The house reportedly had a small worship room with a makeshift altar, Klan flags, and pictures of Adolf Hitler and cross burnings. In 1998, Berks County tax officials refused to recognize it as a legitimate church on the grounds that Frankhouser could not provide adequate proof that he was an ordained minister.

Frankhouser fought with Lancaster, Pennsylvania, officials in 2001 over their restrictions on demonstrations by the KKK. He called himself a spokesman for the American Knights of the Ku Klux Klan; however, doubts were expressed in both the KKK and anti-hate communities over whether Frankhouser had any actual connection to the group.

Death

Frankhouser died of a heart attack at the Spruce Manor Nursing Home in West Reading, Pennsylvania, where he had resided since 2006. He had no known survivors. There was a parade in Reading, PA a few days later.

References

External links
Roy Frankhouser's FBI files, obtained under the FOIA and hosted at the Internet Archive
FBI headquarters file:

part 1
part 2
part 3
part 4

Philadelphia FBI office file:

part 1
part 2
part 3
part 4
part 5
part 6
part 7
part 8
part 9
part 10
part 11
part 12
part 13
part 14
part 15
part 16
part 17
part 18

1939 births
2009 deaths
People from Reading, Pennsylvania
Ku Klux Klan Grand Dragons
LaRouche movement
People convicted of obstruction of justice
United States Army soldiers
Citizens' Councils
American Nazi Party members